Soudamini is a 1951 Indian Telugu-language swashbuckler film, produced and directed by K. B. Nagabhushanam, and presented by Kannamba. It stars Akkineni Nageswara Rao, S. Varalakshmi and Kannamba, with music composed by S. V. Venkatraman. The film was a box office hit.

Plot 
Once upon on a time, there was a kingdom Malwa, it's King Vikramasena and Queen Soudamini are perturbed as childless. But with the blessings from sage Bodhayana, the queen Soudamini conceives. Here sadly, Vikramasena goes into the clutches of court dancer Vilasavati one that falsifies illicit relation between Chief Minister Mahamathi and Soudamini. As a result, Vikramasena charges the death sentence to Mahamathi and exiles Soudamini from the kingdom. Fortunately, Soudamini is protected by a good Samaritan Gopala and gives birth to a baby boy, Udayasena. Meanwhile, promiscuous Vilasavati claws chief commander Kampala too who prisons the King and stamps out his eyes. Being cognizant of it, Soudamini sends Udayasena to protect his father. According to her ordinance, Udayasena reaches a kingdom Kuntala where he is acquainted with its princess Hemavati and they fall in love. Knowing it, King Surasena captures them, but somehow they abscond. But unfortunately, they get separated when Hemavati was seized by a wizard. Eventually, Soudamini reaches Malwa when Kampala recognises and rounds up her. Meanwhile, Udayasena with the help of an angel gets divine flowers from heaven to retrieve his father's vision. Parallelly, he protects Hemavati, lands at Malwa when he was caught and sentenced to death. At last, the angel rescues him when he defeats the plotters, gets back his father's eyesight and reunites his parents. Finally, the movie ends on a happy note with the marriage of Udayasena and Hemavati.

Cast 
Akkineni Nageswara Rao as Udayasena
S. Varalakshmi as Hemavathi
C.S.R. as Vikramasena Maharaj
D. S. Sadasiva Rao as Mahamantri Mahamathi
S. B. Acharya as Maharshi Bodhayana
K. Prabhakara Rao as Kamapala
Kannamba as Maharani Soudamini
T. R. Rajini as Vilasavathi
Vanaja as Devayani

Production 
The film was also made in Tamil with a different cast and was released as Saudamini.

Soundtrack 
Music composed by S. V. Venkatraman. Lyrics were written by Samudrala Sr.

Reception 
Andhra Patrika praised the acting skills of the cast. It critiqued the songs as not that natural and that some of them imitated Kannada and Hindi songs. The portrayal of Akkineni Nageswara Rao's mental status as a closed door was inspired from a 1945-film, Spellbound, and questioned whether the audience understood it, the review continued. It criticised the film for not having enough novelty. Zamin Ryot reviewed the film as a typical film which contains errors, improvements and the storyline of a virtuous wife which are found in other Telugu films. It reviewed that film is engaging despite not having a speciality in the storyline. It has the ethos that the Telugu people would find satisfactory, the review continued. It left a mix of praise and criticism of the cast but appreciated sound and photography.

References

External links 

Films based on Indian folklore
Films scored by S. V. Venkatraman
Indian epic films